Ibrahim Mohamed Hersi (29 June 1944 – 14 March 2020) was a Somali international footballer.

Death
Hersi died in 2020 in the United States, having fled there in 1991.

References

1944 births
2020 deaths
Sportspeople from Asmara
Somalian footballers
Eritrean footballers
Somalia international footballers
Somalian expatriate footballers
Eritrean expatriate footballers
Eritrean expatriate sportspeople in Sudan
Expatriate footballers in Sudan
Expatriate footballers in Ethiopia
Association footballers not categorized by position